The Grif Eos is an Italian high-wing, single-place, hang glider, designed and produced by Grif Italia, of Castel Sant'Elia.

The aircraft is named for Eos the Greek goddess of the dawn.

Design and development
The Eos is Grif's glider designed for competition and advanced cross country flying and has been progressively improved since its introduction in 1997. The Eos is built in three sizes designated by its approximate wing area in square meters.

The aircraft is made from aluminum tubing, with the wing covered in Dacron sailcloth. Its wing is cable braced from a single kingpost and has a nose angle of 132°.

Variants
Eos 13
Eos 14
Eos 15

Specifications (Eos 14)

References

External links

Hang gliders